Class 99 may refer to:

British Rail Class 99 (ships), train ferries operated by Sealink which were allocated British Rail TOPS numbers
British Rail Class 99 (locomotive), a class of bi-mode freight locomotives ordered in 2022
Class of '99, American band
Class 99 (German narrow gauge locomotives), multiple types of German narrow gauge steam locomotives
G&SWR 99 Class